Gruny may refer to:

 Gruny, Somme, Hauts-de-France, France
 Grúny, also spelled Gruni, Belinț, Romania
 Grúny, also spelled Gruni, Cornereva, Romania

People with the surname
 Berta Gruny, mother of Wilhelm Dürr the Younger
 Jim Gruny, commander of Marine Recruit Training Regiment San Diego
 Nadia Gruny (born 1984), American cricket player
 Pascale Gruny (born 1960), French politician

See also
 Grundy (disambiguation)
 Gruni (disambiguation)